Shyambabu Prasad Yadav is a member of the Bharatiya Janata Party from Bihar. He won the 2015 Bihar Legislative Assembly election from Pipra.

On 5 January 2017, Yadav filed a complaint against the Navyuvak Organisation of Jharkhand (NOJ), a Maoist group, claiming that they tried to extort Rs 5 lakh from him. The NOJ posted papers on the walls of Yadav's house and three other BJP workers in Kadama village, which has a large portion of Maoists living there, demanding they either pay the money or face dire consequences.

References

Living people
People from East Champaran district
Bharatiya Janata Party politicians from Bihar
Bihar MLAs 2015–2020
Bihar MLAs 2020–2025
1966 births